This article contains information about the literary events and publications of 1637.

Events
January – Pierre Corneille's tragicomedy Le Cid first performed at the Théâtre du Marais in Paris. Based on Guillén de Castro's play Las mocedades del Cid (1618), it is first published later in the year and sparks the debate of the Querelle du Cid at the Académie française over its failure to observe all the classical unities of drama and supposed lack of moral purpose, but proves popular with audiences.
January 24 – Hamlet is performed before King Charles I and Queen Henrietta Maria at Hampton Court Palace.
July 10 – Thomas Browne is registered as a physician, following which he settles in Norwich.
August 30 – The King's Men mount a production for the English Court of William Cartwright's The Royal Slave at Christ Church, Oxford. The company is paid an extra £30 "for their pains in studying and acting" the drama.
October 2 – The London theatres re-open, having been closed almost continuously since May 1636 because of a severe outbreak of bubonic plague.
December 11 – John Lilburne is arrested following his return from the Netherlands to England for printing and circulating Puritan books (particularly William Prynne's News from Ipswich) not licensed by the Stationers' Company.
unknown date – Willem Blaeu sets up Europe's largest printing house in Amsterdam, specializing in cartography.

New books
María de Zayas – Novelas amorosas y ejemplares
René Descartes – Discours de la méthode pour bien conduire sa raison, et chercher la vérité dans les sciences
Thomas Heywood – Pleasant Dialogues and Dramas
Alonso de Castillo Solórzano – Aventuras del bachiller Trapaza
Baltasar Gracián – El héroe
María de Zayas y Sotomayor – Novelas amorosas y ejemplares. Honesto y entretenido sarao
Marin Mersenne – Traité de l'harmonie universelle
Song Yingxing (宋應星) – Tiangong Kaiwu(天工開物, Exploitation of the Works of Nature)

New drama
Pedro Calderón de la Barca
A secreto agravio, secreta venganza
El mayor monstruo del mundo
El médico de su honra
El Tetrarca published
Georgios Chortatzis (probably posthumously) – Erofili published
Pierre Corneille – Le Cid
Isaac de Benserade
La Mort d’Achille et la Dispute de ses armes
Gustaphe ou l’Heureuse Ambition
Iphis et Iante
John Fletcher and Philip Massinger – The Elder Brother published
François Tristan l'Hermite – Penthée
Thomas Heywood – The Royal King and the Loyal Subject published
John Milton – Comus (masque) published
Thomas Nabbes – Microcosmus, a Moral Masque
Thomas Neale – The Warde
Joseph Rutter – The Cid, Part 1 published
James Shirley – five plays published in five single-play quartos: The Example, The Gamester, Hyde Park, The Lady of Pleasure and The Young Admiral
Sir John Suckling – Aglaura
Joost van den Vondel – Gijsbrecht van Aemstel written
George Wilde – The Converted Robber

Poetry
William Alexander, 1st Earl of Stirling – Recreations of the Muses
James Day – A New Spring of Divine Poetry
Thomas Jordan – Poetical Varieties
Shackerley Marmion – Cupid and Psyche, a 2000-line translation and adaptation of The Golden Ass of Apuleius
Gabriel Bocángel – La lira de las musas
Miguel Dicastillo – Aula de Dios
Lope de Vega – La vega del Parnaso
Jorge Pinto de Morales – Maravillas del Parnaso y flor de los mejores romances graves, burlescos y satíricos

Births
December 24 – Pierre Jurieu, French theologian (died 1713)
December 27 – Petar Kanavelić, Croatian poet and songwriter (died 1719)
December 30 – William Cave, English theologian (died 1713)
Unknown date
Agnes Campbell, Scottish printer (died 1716)
Zeb-un-Nisa, Sufi poet (died 1702)
Probable year of birth – Robert Ferguson, Scottish pamphleteer (died 1714)

Deaths
February 9 – Philemon Holland, English translator and schoolmaster (born 1552)
February 24 – Dominicus Arumaeus, Dutch legal writer (born 1579)
February – Gervase Markham, English poet (born c. 1568)
March 19 – Péter Pázmány, Hungarian philosopher and cardinal (born 1570)
May 19 – Isaac Beeckman, Dutch philosopher and diarist (born 1588)
August 6 – Ben Jonson, English poet and dramatist (born c. 1572)
August 10
Johann Gerhard, German theologian (born 1582)
Edward King, Anglo-Irish poet (drowned in shipwreck, born 1612)
October 5 – Daniel Cramer, German theologian and dramatist (born 1568)

References

 
Years of the 17th century in literature